Charlotte is a Japanese anime television series produced by P.A. Works, and the second original anime series created by the visual novel brand Key following Angel Beats! in 2010. The series was created and written by Jun Maeda and directed by Yoshiyuki Asai, with music by Maeda, Hikarishuyo, and the group Anant-Garde Eyes. The characters were designed by Kanami Sekiguchi based on Na-Ga's original concepts. The story takes place in an alternate reality where a small percentage of children manifest superhuman abilities upon reaching puberty. A focus is placed on Yuu Otosaka, a high school boy who awakens the ability to temporarily possess others, which brings him to the attention of Nao Tomori, the student council president of a school founded as a haven for children with such abilities.

The 13-episode series aired in Japan between July 4 and September 26, 2015 on the BS11, GTV, GYT, and Tokyo MX television networks. It was simulcast by Aniplex Channel, Crunchyroll, Hulu, Daisuki, Viewster, Animax Asia, AnimeLab, and All 4. The series was released on seven Blu-ray/DVD volumes between September 23, 2015 and March 30, 2016 in Japan, with an original video animation episode included on the seventh volume. The series is licensed in North America by Aniplex of America, who released the series on two Blu-ray compilation volumes on August 16, 2016 and November 15, 2016. The series is also licensed in Australia by Madman Entertainment.

Several insert theme songs by two in-story bands are also used, featuring songs sung by Maaya Uchida for the band How-Low-Hello and songs sung by Marina for the band Zhiend. For Zhiend, these include: "Live for You" (episode two), "Clouded Sky" (episode two and five), "Fallin'" (episodes five, eight and eleven), "Heavy Rain" (episode eight), "Blood Colour", "Scar on Face", "Adore" and "Trigger" (episode nine); and "Sinking Ships" (episode thirteen).


Episode list

References

External links

 

Key (company)
Lists of anime episodes